Budapest-Nyugati (western) railway station, generally referred to simply as Nyugati, is one of the three main railway terminals in Budapest, Hungary. The station is on the Pest side of Budapest, accessible by the 4 and 6 tramline and the M3 metro line.

History

The station was planned by August de Serres and was built by the Eiffel Company. It was opened on 28 October 1877. It replaced a previous station, which was the terminus of Hungary's first railway line, the Pest–Vác line (constructed in 1846). This building was pulled down in order to construct the Grand Boulevard.

The station gave its name to the adjacent Western Square ('Nyugati tér'), a major intersection where Teréz körút (Theresia Boulevard), Szent István körút (Saint Stephen Boulevard), Váci út (Váci Avenue), and Bajcsy-Zsilinszky út (Bajcsy-Zsilinszky Avenue) converge. The square also serves as a transport hub with several bus routes, tram routes 4 and 6, and a station on M3 of the Budapest Metro.

Since 2007 Hungarian State Railways (MÁV) has operated regular services between the terminal and Budapest Ferenc Liszt International Airport Terminal 1, although Terminal 1 has been closed since 2012 and all departures and arrivals have been consolidated in Terminal 2A and 2B, which is 4 kilometers away.

Beside the terminal and partially above its open area there is the WestEnd City Center shopping mall. Inside the station is a McDonald's restaurant which has been described as the "most elegant" McDonald's in the world.

The music video for Gwen Stefani's 2008 single Early Winter was partly shot at Nyugati.
Starting in May 2016 the key scenes of the movie Terminal were shot over 27 nights.

Train services
The station provides access to the following services:

Intercity services Budapest - Szolnok - Debrecen - Záhony - Mukachevo
Intercity services Budapest - Cegléd - Kecskemét - Szeged

References

External links

Nyugati Railway Station and Royal Waiting Room

Railway stations in Budapest
Railway stations opened in 1877
1877 establishments in Austria-Hungary
Gustave Eiffel